Forkhead box protein O4 is a protein that in humans is encoded by the FOXO4 gene.

Structure and function 

FOXO4 is a member of the forkhead family transcription factors O subclass, which is characterized by a winged helix domain used for DNA binding. There are 4 members of the FOXO family, including FOXO1, FOXO3, and FOXO6. Their activity is modified by many post translational activities, such as phosphorylation, ubiquitination, and acetylation. Depending on this modified state, FOXO4 binding affinity for DNA is altered, allowing for FOXO4 to regulate many cellular pathways including oxidative stress signaling, longevity, insulin signaling, cell cycle progression, and apoptosis. Two of the main upstream regulators of FOXO4 activity are phosphoinositide 3- kinase (PI3K) and serine/threonine kinase AKT/PKB. Both PI3K and AKT modify FOXO4 and prevent it from translocating to the nucleus, effectively preventing the transcription of the downstream FOXO targets.

Clinical significance

Associations with longevity 

FOXO transcription factors have been shown to be the down downstream effector molecules of insulin-like growth factor (IGF) signaling pathway. In the absence of insulin, PI3K is inactive, so the FOXO homolog daf-16 is able to translocate to the nucleus and turn on many genetic pathways associated with longevity in the roundworm Caenorhabditis elegans. FOXO's activation of these pathways produces an increase in lifespan for worms, flies, mice; similar variants of FOXO3a have been associated with longer human lives as well.

FOXO4 can bind with p53 protein to induce cellular senescence. A peptide competing with FOXO4 can act as a senolytic by excluding p53 from the nucleus.

Cancer 

Many different kinds of cancers have been observed to contain mutations that promote AKT phosphorylation, and thus the inactivation of FOXOs, effectively preventing proper cell cycle regulation. FOXO4 activates the cell cycle dependent kinase inhibitor, P27, which in turn prevents tumors from progressing into G1. In HER-2 positive tumor cells, increasing FOXO4 activity reduces tumor size. Chromosomal translocations of FOXO4 have been shown to be a cause of acute leukemia. The fusion proteins formed by these translocations lack the DNA-binding domain, causing the protein to lose function.

In gastric cancers (GC), it has been observed that there were lower levels of FOXO4 mRNA in cancers that had already progressed to invading lymph nodes compared to cancers that remained in situ. When compared to normal tissue, all GC epithelia had lower levels of FOXO4 located in the nucleus, consistent with less FOXO4 effector activity and FOXO4's function as a suppressor of carcinogenic properties. It does this by causing cell cycle arrest between the Go and S phases, preventing cell proliferation, as well as by inhibiting metastasis by downregulating vimentin. These results are consistent with FOXO4 providing a role in inhibiting the epithelia to mesenchymal transition (EMT).

In non-small cell lung carcinoma, there are varying levels of FOXO4 expressed that correspond to how the cancer was staged; worse cases had the lowest amount of FOXO4 while less severe cases had higher levels of FOXO4.  As with gastric cancer, these cancers with the lowest levels of FOXO4 also had the lowest levels of E-cadherin and highest levels of vimentin, consistent with FOXO4 acting as a suppressor of the EMT phenotype.

Interactions 

PIN1, Mdm2 – FOXO4 has been shown to interact with PIN1 and Mdm2.

CIC – chromosomal translocation resulting in a fusion CIC-FOXO4 protein is observed in some tumors.

See also 
 FOX proteins

References

Further reading

External links 
 
 

Forkhead transcription factors
Aging-related proteins